Bordj Ménaïel is a district in Boumerdès Province, Algeria. It was named after its capital, Bordj Menaïel.

Municipalities
The district is further divided into 4 municipalities:
Bordj Menaïel
Djinet
Leghata
Zemmouri

Villages
The villages of Bordj Menaïel District are:

History

French conquest

 Expedition of the Col des Beni Aïcha (1837)
 First Battle of the Issers (1837)

Algerian Revolution

Salafist terrorism

 2008 Zemmouri bombing (9 August 2008)
 2010 Bordj Menaïel bombing (21 September 2010)

Rivers
 Oued Chender
 Oued Djemaa
 Oued Menaïel

Notable people

 Farouk Belkaïd, footballer
 Abdelhafid Benchabla, boxer
 Bachir Boudjelid, footballer
 Faouzi Chaouchi, footballer
 Zinedine Ferhat, footballer
 Omar Fetmouche, artist
 Hocine Mezali, journalist and writer
 Ali Rial, footballer
 Mustapha Toumi, songwriter, lyricist, composer, poet and painter
 Fatma Zohra Zamoum, writer and film-maker

References

Districts of Boumerdès Province